Collin Wilcox (September 21, 1924 – July 12, 1996) was an American mystery writer who published 30 books in 30 years.

Born in Detroit, Michigan, September 21, 1924, his first book was The Black Door (1967), featuring a sleuth possessing extrasensory perception. His major series of novels was about Lieutenant Frank Hastings of the San Francisco Police Department. Titles in the Hastings series included Hire a Hangman, Dead Aim, Hiding Place, Long Way Down and Stalking Horse. Two of his last books, Full Circle and Find Her a Grave, featured a new hero-sleuth, Alan Bernhardt, an eccentric theater director. Wilcox also published under the pseudonym "Carter Wick".
 
Wilcox's most famous series-detective was the television character Sam McCloud, a New Mexico deputy solving New York crime. The "urban cowboy" was played by Dennis Weaver in the 1970–1977 TV series McCloud. Wilcox wrote two novelizations based on scripts from the series: McCloud (1972) and The New Mexican Connection (1974).

Wilcox died in San Francisco, July 12, 1996, from cancer at the age of 71. Wilcox was survived by two sons, Christopher of Berkeley, California, Jeff of Lafayette, California, and five grandchildren. His five grandchildren are Scotty, Conor, Hayley, Jessica, and Emma.

See also

 Crime fiction
 Detective fiction
 Whodunit
 List of crime writers
 List of mystery writers

References

External links
 

American mystery writers
20th-century American novelists
Writers from Detroit
1924 births
1996 deaths
Deaths from cancer in California
American male novelists
20th-century American male writers
Novelists from Michigan